The Inter-American Telecommunication Commission or Comisión Interamericana de Telecomunicaciones (CITEL) is an entity of the Organization of American States. It was originally created as the Inter-American Electrical Communication Commission at the Fifth International American Conference in May 1923.

CITEL's job is to coordinate telecommunications related mandates of the OAS General Assembly and those enacted during the Summits of the Americas.

See also
International Telecommunication Union
Asia-Pacific Telecommunity (APT)
African Telecommunications Union (ATU)
European Conference of Postal and Telecommunications Administrations (CEPT)

External links
CITEL webpage

Organization of American States